Olivia Mehaffey (born 1998) is a professional golfer from Northern Ireland.

Amateur career
Mehaffey enjoyed a very successful amateur career and reached a rank of No. 5 in the World Amateur Golf Rankings and No. 2 in the European Amateur Golf Rankings.

In 2014, she won the Irish Girls' U18 Open Strokeplay, in 2015 the Helen Holm Scottish Women's Open Championship, and she won the Welsh Ladies Open Stroke Play Championship in both 2015 and 2016. In 2016, she also won the Irish Women's Open Stroke Play Championship and the Irish Women's Amateur Close Championship. She was a semi-finalist at the British Ladies Amateur in 2015 and finished 3rd at the 2016 European Ladies Amateur Championship.

Mehaffey played in the Curtis Cup twice and in 2016 at Dun Laoghaire Golf Club outside of Dublin helped lead the Great Britain & Ireland team to victory after going 3-1-1.

In 2016, Mehaffey along with Leona Maguire and Annabel Wilson won the third place bronze medal for Ireland in the 2016 Espirito Santo Trophy held at Mayakoka El Camaleon Golf Club in Mexico. 

Mehaffey joined Arizona State University in 2016 and played with the Arizona State Sun Devils women's golf team. As a freshman in 2017, she helped ASU win the NCAA title by notching match-play victories in all three wins over Florida, Stanford and Northwestern (title match). She won the 2019 Pac-12 Championship and NCAA Norman Regional back-to-back. She overcame a four-stroke deficit in the final round to win the Pac-12 Championship in a playoff with Albane Valenzuela. She took advantage of the NCAA granting an additional year of eligibility for spring-sport athletes due to COVID-19 cutting short the 2019-20 season. 

Mehaffey's amateur pedigree earned her spots in two U.S. Women's Opens and three Women's British Opens, the first the 2016 Women's British Open at Woburn Golf and Country Club when she was 18. She also competed in the 2020 ANA Inspiration, where she made her first major cut. In 2021, she finished in a share of ninth place in her second appearance at the Augusta National Women's Amateur. She started in the Arizona Women's Classic on the Symetra Tour in March, where she finished in a share of sixth place after leading the event at the half way stage.

Professional career
Mehaffey turned professional after the spring semester in 2021 and made her LPGA Tour debut as a professional on home soil in Ballymena, 30 miles from Belfast, at the inaugural ISPS Handa World Invitational. She finished tied for 17th place.

Mehaffey attended the LPGA Q-School in 2021 for the first time. She had plans to attend three years earlier but fell and broke her hand. Then, the COVID-19 pandemic postponed it further.

Amateur wins
2014 Irish Girls' U18 Open Strokeplay
2015 Helen Holm Scottish Women's Open Championship, Welsh Ladies Open Stroke Play Championship
2016 Irish Women's Open Stroke Play Championship, Irish Women's Amateur Close Championship, Welsh Ladies Open Stroke Play Championship
2018 Northrop Grumman Regional Challenge
2019 Bruin Wave Invitational, Pac-12 Championship, NCAA Norman Regional

Source:

Results in LPGA majors
Results not in chronological order before 2019.

CUT = missed the half-way cut
NT = no tournament
T = tied

Team appearances
Amateur
European Young Masters (representing Ireland): 2011, 2012, 2013
Junior Vagliano Trophy (representing Great Britain & Ireland): 2013
Youth Olympic Games (representing Ireland): 2014
Junior Solheim Cup (representing Europe): 2015
Vagliano Trophy (representing Great Britain & Ireland): 2015, 2017
Girls Home Internationals (representing Ireland): 2012, 2015
Women's Home Internationals (representing Ireland): 2013, 2014, 2015, 2016
European Girls' Team Championship (representing Ireland): 2011, 2012, 2013
European Ladies' Team Championship (representing Ireland): 2014, 2015, 2016, 2017, 2018
Curtis Cup (representing Great Britain & Ireland): 2016 (winners), 2018
Espirito Santo Trophy (representing Ireland): 2016
Arnold Palmer Cup (representing the International team): 2018, 2020 (winners)
Astor Trophy (representing Great Britain & Ireland): 2019

References

External links

Irish female golfers
Arizona State Sun Devils women's golfers
1998 births
Living people